Axelle Mollaret (born 3 September 1992 in Annecy, Haute-Savoie) is a French skyrunner and ski mountaineer.

Biography 
She is physiotherapist. She has been member of the Ski Mountaineering French national selection since 2013. 
In 2015 she won the biennial Trofeo Mezzalama with teammates Emelie Forsberg and Jennifer Fiechter.

Selected results 
 Pierra Menta
 2013 :   with  Elena Nicolini
 2014 :  with  Émilie Gex-Fabry
 2015 :   with  Emelie Forsberg
 2016 :  Winner with Laetitia Roux
 2017 :  with Lorna Bonnel
 2018 :  Winner with  Katia Tomatis

References

1992 births
Living people
French female mountain runners
French female ski mountaineers
Sportspeople from Annecy
French sky runners
21st-century French women